Patterson High School is a high school in unincorporated St. Mary Parish, Louisiana, United States, near the city of Patterson. It is a part of the St. Mary Parish School Board.

Athletics
Patterson High competes in the LHSAA in the 3A classification in all of the following varsity sports:  baseball, basketball (boys and girls), cross country (boys), football, golf, softball, swimming, tennis, track and field, and volleyball.

Football
On January 15, 2009, Kenny Hilliard, a sophomore running back at Patterson High was named ESPN RISE Sophomore Player of the Year.

Awards
Patterson High was named a Blue Ribbon Schools in 2006 in which former principal, Michael Brocato, and head of the math department, Cathie Vernon, traveled to Washington D.C. to accept the award.

Notable alumni

Dalton Hilliard, NFL player
Ike Hilliard, NFL player
Kenny Hilliard, NFL player
Gillis Wilson, NFL player

References

External links
 

Public high schools in Louisiana
Schools in St. Mary Parish, Louisiana